Carlos Joel Salcedo Hernández (born 29 September 1993), also known as El Titán, is a Mexican professional footballer who plays as a centre-back for Liga MX club Juárez.

Salcedo began his youth career at Guadalajara in 2006 and moved to Tigres UANL and then Real Salt Lake, where he started his professional career in 2013. He would return to Guadalajara in 2015, and the following year made his move abroad with loan spells at Fiorentina and Eintracht Frankfurt, making a permanent move with the latter in 2018.

A Mexican international since 2015, Salcedo has represented Mexico at the 2015 Copa América and Copa América Centenario, the 2019 CONCACAF Gold Cup, the 2016 Summer Olympics, the 2017 FIFA Confederations Cup, and the 2018 FIFA World Cup.

Club career

Early career
Having previously played at C.D. Guadalajara's and Tigres UANL's youth academy teams, Salcedo joined Major League Soccer (MLS) club Real Salt Lake's academy in January 2012. In August of the same year he began training with the first-team squad. Salcedo signed a home grown player contract with Salt Lake in January 2013, having met the minimum requirement to be defined as "home grown" of one year academy training.

Real Salt Lake
On 4 May 2013, Salcedo made his professional MLS debut for Real Salt Lake as a substitute against Vancouver Whitecaps, ending in a 2–0 win entering as a substitute in the 89th minute. In the second half of the 2013 season he was a regular starter for Salt Lake starting 12 games by season's end.

Following a lack of playing time in the 2014 season with Real Salt Lake, in November 2014, Salcedo took to Twitter asking the team not to bring him into future team plans, citing issues with former general manager Garth Lagerwey.

Guadalajara

On 6 January 2015, Salcedo returned to Mexican side C.D. Guadalajara, for the price of $450,000. Salcedo made his debut for the club in a 2–1 win at home against Pumas UNAM in which he played the first 60 minutes.
On 1 March, Salcedo scored his first goal in a 3–0 win at home against Monterrey in which he played the full 90 minutes. At the end of his first tournament with Chivas, he was listed in the Best XI.

The following season, he would win the Apertura 2015 Copa MX with Guadalajara, defeating Club León 1–0, qualifying them to the 2016 Supercopa MX, where they would also go on to win, defeating Veracruz 2–0.

Loan to Fiorentina
On 21 August 2016, Italian club ACF Fiorentina announced they had acquired Salcedo on loan, with the option to purchase the player at the end of the deal. Salcedo made his debut with Fiorentina on 15 September against PAOK in their 0–0 draw in the Europa League. He made his Serie A debut ten days later against Milan in a 0–0 draw.

Loan to Eintracht Frankfurt
On 13 June 2017, Salcedo joined German side Eintracht Frankfurt on an initial loan from Guadalajara with an option to buy. Following a shoulder injury sustained at the 2017 FIFA Confederations Cup, Salcedo's Bundesliga debut came on 9 September against Borussia Mönchengladbach which ended in a 1–0 win for Eintracht Frankfurt, playing the entirety of the match.

In April 2018, Salcedo was listed as one of three center-backs nominated for the Bundesliga Team of the Season, alongside Mats Hummels and Jerome Boateng. On 14 May, Eintracht Frankfurt announced they had signed Salcedo to a four-year contract, tying him to the club until 2022. On 19 May, Salcedo won the DFB-Pokal with Eintracht Frankfurt after they defeated Bayern Munich 3–1 in the final.

Eintracht Frankfurt
On 12 August 2018, Salcedo played in his first competitive game of the season in Frankfurt's 5–0 loss to Bayern Munich for the DFL-Supercup. On 1 September, during a league match against Werder Bremen, which Frankfurt lost 2–1, Salcedo suffered a high ankle sprain, meaning he would be ruled out of action for an undetermined amount of time. On 2 December, he reappeared as an unused substitute in Frankfurt's 2–1 loss to Wolfsburg. Six days later, he made his return to the starting eleven in Frankfurt's 1–0 loss to Hertha Berlin.

Tigres UANL
On 22 January 2019, amidst much speculation, Tigres UANL announced via social media the signing of Salcedo to a four-year contract, being handed the number 3 which had previously been worn by Juninho, who had retired at the conclusion of the 2018 Apertura. He had cited family issues as the main reason for returning to Mexico. Salcedo also revealed that he did not return to C.D. Guadalajara because the team was only looking to acquire him on loan from Frankfurt, an offer which was declined by the German side. Two weeks after being officially presented with Tigres, Salcedo made his Liga MX debut in a 2–0 victory against Veracruz.

On 12 March, in the second leg of the 2019 CONCACAF Champions League quarter-finals against MLS side Houston Dynamo, Salcedo scored his first goal with Tigres in a 1–0 victory. Four days later, he scored his first league goal with Tigres in a 4–1 victory over Querétaro. Despite Tigres finishing runners-up in the CONCACAF Champions League Finals to city rivals C.F. Monterrey, Salcedo was included in the competition's Best XI. The following month, on 26 May, Salcedo won the Clausura championship with Tigres after defeating León 1–0 on aggregate in the finals.

On 22 December 2020, Tigres won the CONCACAF Champions League after defeating MLS side Los Angeles FC 2–1.

Toronto FC
On 31 January 2022, Salcedo returned to MLS, signing with Toronto FC as a Designated Player. He made his debut on 26 February in the season opener against FC Dallas. On 12 July 2022, Toronto and Salcedo mutually agreed to terminate his contract to allow him to move back to Mexico for family reasons.

Juárez
Shortly after leaving Toronto FC, Salcedo returned to Liga MX, signing with Juárez. He made his debut on 22 July against Necaxa.

International career

Youth
Salcedo was called up by Raúl Gutiérrez to participate in the 2014 Central American and Caribbean Games. He went on to appear in four matches as Mexico won the tournament.

On 18 September 2015, Salcedo was once again selected by coach Raúl Gutiérrez to play in the CONCACAF Olympic Qualifying Championship. Chosen as team captain for the competition, he appeared in four matches, winning the tournament and a berth to the Summer Olympics.

On 7 July 2016, Salcedo was named in Mexico's 23-man squad for the  Summer Olympics in Rio de Janeiro. He appeared in all three group stage matches, scoring the fourth goal in a 5–1 defeat of Fiji, though Mexico failed to make it out of the group after finishing in third.

Senior
Salcedo was called up by Miguel Herrera to participate with the senior national team and on 15 April 2015, he made his debut in a friendly game against the United States, losing 0–2. He was included in the final roster to participate in that year's Copa América. He only made one appearance, on 15 June, coming on as a substitute in the 71st minute for Adrián Aldrete in a 3–3 draw against host-nation Chile.

On 8 June 2017, Salcedo was included by Juan Carlos Osorio to be Mexico's 23-man squad for the FIFA Confederations Cup in Russia. On 21 June, during Mexico's second group stage match against New Zealand, Salcedo was taken off during the first half after sustaining a shoulder injury following a collision with striker Chris Wood. He was subsequently ruled out for the rest of the tournament.

On 27 March 2018, during a friendly match against Croatia he would pick up a fractured left collarbone injury, putting in risk a call up for the FIFA World Cup. Salcedo was subsequently named in the final 23-man squad for the World Cup. He played in all group stage matches, including in the round-of-16 loss against Brazil. Following Mexico's elimination, Salcedo pondered his future with the national team, citing personal issues. He was eventually called up to participate in September friendlies by interim manager Ricardo Ferretti, but withdrew due to a high ankle sprain injury.

On 6 June 2019, Salcedo was called up by coach Gerardo Martino to participate in the Gold Cup. In the quarter-final match against Costa Rica, as the match was sent to a penalty shoot-out following a 1–1 tie, he scored Mexico's winning penalty before Mexico goalkeeper Guillermo Ochoa blocked the subsequent Costa Rica shot. As Mexico went on to win the tournament after defeating the United States 1–0 in the final, he was named in the competition's Best XI.

On 30 September 2020, he appeared as captain in a friendly match against Guatemala, winning 3–0. On 14 November, Salcedo scored his first goal in a friendly match against South Korea, winning 3–2.

Style of play

A natural center-back, Salcedo has been deployed as a full-back: on the right side while playing for the Mexico national team and on the left when he used to play for Real Salt Lake. He is known as "a good passer and as a concentrated player who likes to play long balls, he is known for his well timed slide tackles and his strength in the back line, his abilities to win most of the aerial duels makes him a complete defender." He has also been described as "tall, strong, physically imposing and quick on the ball. He has superb slide tackling skills and is willing to throw his body into danger if it means stopping an opponents attack." He is commonly known by his nickname Titan, as a result of his imposing physical presence and his speedy recoveries from injuries, as well as being able to play through them. In an interview with Tom Marshall from Goal.com, Salcedo stated that his early move to the MLS would help develop his playing style, arguing "that MLS is generally more physical than in Mexico, but that learning to combat a more direct style complements the technique and comfort on the ball that was drilled into him, first at [Guadalajara] and later with Tigres."

Personal
His father, Carlos Salcedo Snr, played for Atlas F.C. in Mexico, his great-grandfather had played for C.D. Guadalajara and been a league winner in Mexico. His great-uncle, Hugo Salcedo, played Soccer for the U.S. at the 1972 Olympic Games. His son and Carlos's first-cousin, once removed, Jorge Salcedo played for four teams in MLS between 1996 and 2000, and was capped by the United States national soccer team.

Career statistics

Club

International

International goals
Scores and results list Mexico's goal tally first.

Honours
Guadalajara
Copa MX: Apertura 2015
Supercopa MX: 2016

Eintracht Frankfurt
DFB-Pokal: 2017–18

Tigres UANL
Liga MX: Clausura 2019
CONCACAF Champions League: 2020

Toronto FC
Canadian Championship: 2020

Mexico Youth
Central American and Caribbean Games: 2014
CONCACAF Olympic Qualifying Championship: 2015

Mexico
CONCACAF Gold Cup: 2019

Individual
Liga MX Best XI: Clausura 2015
CONCACAF Champions League Team of the Tournament: 2019
CONCACAF Gold Cup Best XI: 2019
IFFHS CONCACAF Men's Best XI: 2020
IFFHS CONCACAF Men's Team of the Decade: 2011–2020
IFFHS CONCACAF Men's Team of All Time: 2021

References

External links
 
 
 
 
 
 
 
 

1993 births
Living people
Mexican expatriate footballers
Mexican footballers
Mexico international footballers
Real Salt Lake players
C.D. Guadalajara footballers
ACF Fiorentina players
Eintracht Frankfurt players
Tigres UANL footballers
Toronto FC players
FC Juárez footballers
Association football defenders
Footballers from Guadalajara, Jalisco
Expatriate soccer players in the United States
Expatriate footballers in Italy
Expatriate footballers in Germany
Expatriate soccer players in Canada
Homegrown Players (MLS)
Major League Soccer players
Liga MX players
Serie A players
Bundesliga players
2015 Copa América players
Footballers at the 2016 Summer Olympics
2017 FIFA Confederations Cup players
Olympic footballers of Mexico
Mexican expatriate sportspeople in the United States
Mexican expatriate sportspeople in Italy
Mexican expatriate sportspeople in Germany
Mexican expatriate sportspeople in Canada
2018 FIFA World Cup players
2019 CONCACAF Gold Cup players
CONCACAF Gold Cup-winning players
2021 CONCACAF Gold Cup players
Central American and Caribbean Games gold medalists for Mexico
Central American and Caribbean Games medalists in football
Competitors at the 2014 Central American and Caribbean Games
Designated Players (MLS)